In computing, naming schemes are often used for objects connected into computer networks.

Naming schemes in computing
Server naming is a common tradition. It makes it more convenient to refer to a machine by name than by its IP address.

The CIA named their servers after states.

Server names may be named by their role or follow a common theme such as colors, countries, cities, planets, chemical element, scientists, etc. If servers are in multiple different geographical locations they may be named by closest airport code.

Such as web-01, web-02, web-03, mail-01, db-01, db-02.

Airport code example:
 lax-001
 lax-002
 arn-001

City-State-Nation example:
 3-character unique number
 2-character production/development classifier
 3-character city ID
 2-character state/province/region ID
 2-character nation ID

Thus, a production server in Minneapolis, Minnesota would be nnn.ps.min.mn.us.example.com, or a development server in Vancouver, BC, would be nnn.ds.van.bc.ca.example.com.

Large networks often use a systematic naming scheme, such as using a location (e.g. a department) plus a purpose to generate a name for a computer.

For example, a web server in NY may be called "nyc-www-04.xyz.net".

However, smaller networks will frequently use a more personalized naming scheme to keep track of the many hosts. Popular naming schemes include trees, planets, rocks, etc.

Network naming can be hierarchical in nature, such as the Internet's Domain Name System. Indeed, the Internet employs several universally applicable naming methods: uniform resource name (URN), uniform resource locator (URL), and uniform resource identifier (URI).

See also 
 Systematic name
 Geospatial network
 Naming convention

References

External links 
 RFC 1178 - "Choosing a Name for Your Computer"
 RFC 2100 - "The Naming of Hosts"
 Naming schemes
 Naming conventions in Active Directory
 URIs, URLs, and URNs: Clarifications and Recommendations 1.0

Naming conventions
Network addressing
Servers (computing)